Battle of Belh was a successful battle of the Chagatai Khanate against Timur.

Just before they were decisively defeated by the Chagatais at the Battle of Tashkent, Timur and Hussein were in Balkh. He added his armies - the divisions of Olcay Buga Süldüs and Kebek Khan - to his armies. These two armies would remain at their disposal and add strength to their power. The two emirs came from their personal entourage, tribal emirs, non-tribal. They attacked the Chagatais with this army. However, the Chagatais did not receive any support from the neighbouring rulers of Moghulistan; As many times before, Ulus tribes were divided into two this time. Sülüs and Hadan tribes, both sides of the fight. He also had orders. The Chagatais were led by their khan Tughlugh Timur, who had previously fought and lost against Emir Hussein and fled to Mongolia. This time however he had the support of Hatlani and Tughluk Süldüs. Emir Hussein and Timur fought a bloody battle near Balkh with the Chagatais and they were defeated. But the Chagatais also had to retreat when their khan Tughlugh Timur died. Therefore although the battle was a victory for the Chagatais it resulted in the killing and death of Chagatai khan Tughlugh Timur. Due to this battle, the young Timur became acquainted with warfare and this battle would be a precursor to his future campaigns as a major leader.

References

Citations

General 

Battles involving the Timurid Empire
Belh